Broken Bones and Bloody Kisses is the debut EP from Canadian post-hardcore band Boys Night Out. The EP was released on August 20, 2002 through One Day Savior Recordings.

The songs "The Only Honest Lovesong", "Sketch Artist Composite", and "Victor Versus the Victim" previously appeared on the demo EP You Are My Canvas.

Musical style and lyrics
Broken Bones and Bloody Kisses features a heavier and more aggressive sound compared to the band's later releases. The sound of the EP has been described as emo, screamo, metalcore, and pop punk. The album's lyrics and themes have been described as morbid and macabre.

Track listing

Personnel
Boys Night Out
 Connor Lovat-Fraser – vocals, layout and design
 Jeff Davis – guitars, vocals
 Rob Pasalic – guitars, vocals
 Dave Costa – bass, vocals
 Ben Arseneau – drums

Additional personnel
Engineering and mixing by Joe Higgins and Matt Walbroehl.
Mastered at West West Side by Alan Douches.

References

External links
Official Band Website

Boys Night Out (band) EPs
2002 debut EPs